Nelson was a small southern town in Durham County, North Carolina, United States.  The community was centered at the intersection of Miami Boulevard and North Carolina Highway 54. It was largely a farming community, with several tobacco and livestock farms as well as a tight knit family oriented community. Though still on the map, it has been all but erased by the growth surrounding the Research Triangle Park. All of the farms have been paved over and old farmhouses and barns torn down to accommodate the huge corporations and other business entities. A few of the older small homes are still there, as well as the Cedar Fork Baptist church, but the community itself essentially no longer exists.

Unincorporated communities in Durham County, North Carolina
Unincorporated communities in North Carolina